Crabtree Ledge Light was a sparkplug lighthouse on Frenchman Bay, Maine.
It was first established in 1890 and deactivated in 1933.  It was a brown conical tower on a black cylindrical pier located on Crabtree Ledge, about one mile off Crabtree Neck at the north end of Frenchman Bay. Crabtree is named after the American privateer Captain Agreen Crabtree, the first settler of Hancock.

References

Lighthouses completed in 1890
Lighthouses in Hancock County, Maine
1890 establishments in Maine